Getazat, also known Getashen as until 1948, and Aghjaghshlagh,) is a village in the Artashat Municipality of the Ararat Province of Armenia.

References

External links 

World Gazetteer: Armenia – World-Gazetteer.com

Populated places in Ararat Province
Yazidi populated places in Armenia